Vice admiral Matthieu Borsboom (born 1959) is a retired Royal Netherlands Navy officer who is a former Commander of the Royal Netherlands Navy and Admiral Benelux, and has served with the International Security Assistance Force in Afghanistan.

Naval career
Borsboom was commissioned into the Royal Netherlands Navy as a midshipman in 1978 and was commissioned in 1981. His first assignment was to HNLMS Tromp, followed by a posting to minesweeper HNLMS Naaldwijk and service as executive officer of HNLMS Veere, another minesweeper. He studied at the University of Groningen in Groningen before being sent to patrol vessel HNLMS Hadda as executive officer in 1983. He qualified as a Principal Warfare Officer in 1986, having studied at the Operational School in Den Helder, before being assigned to the frigate HNLMS Witte de With and then HNLMS De Ruyter. He went on to qualify as an anti-submarine warfare officer and was posted to HNLMS Piet Hein as head of the operations department at the height of the Cold War.

As a lieutenant commander in 1991, Borsboom transferred to the Centre for Automation of Weapon and Command Systems before returning to sea duty aboard , which was involved in supporting United Nations operations in the Caribbean, later serving aboard HNLMS Philips van Almonde. He attended the Defence Staff College in 1996 and was promoted to the rank of commander and took charge of the bureau for underwater sensors at the Ministry of Defence in The Hague, the city of his birth, for two years.

He commanded a ship for the first time when he was sent to HNLMS Tjerk Hiddes in late 1998, after which he commanded  between 1999 and 2001. After commanding ships, he took up a staff position in The Hague before promotion to captain in 2002 and another staff assignment. He then attended the Advanced Defence Course in 2004 and served in another staff post before promotion to commodore in 2005.

High command

Borsboom attained flag officer status with promotion to rear admiral in 2007 and was appointed Director of Operational Policy, Requirements and Plans. In November 2008, he deployed to Afghanistan to become Deputy Chief of Staff for Stability in Kabul as part of the International Security Assistance Force. He reported directly to the commander of ISAF, then General Stanley A. McChrystal, and had responsibility for supporting elections in the country. He was succeeded by German Army Major General Richard Rossmanith and returned to the Netherlands in November 2009 and was promoted to vice admiral on 4 January 2010, assuming the appointment of Commander, Royal Netherlands Navy on 22 January 2010. He was succeeded as Commander of the Royal Netherlands Navy by Lieutenant General of the Marines Rob Verkerk on 26 September 2014.

Personal life
Borsboom was born in The Hague in 1959. He is married to Ernie Borsboom-Miga and lives in Den Helder. The couple have three children, all of whom joined the Royal Netherlands Navy.

Military decorations
  Officer of the Order of Orange-Nassau
  Commemorative Medal for Peace Operations
  Officers' Cross
  Inauguration Medal 1980
  Royal Dutch Navy Medal
  Cross for demonstrated marching skills
  Cross for the Two Day Military Performance Course
  NATO Medal
  Grand Officer of the Order of Naval Merit (Brazil)
  Commander in the National Order of Merit (France)

References

External links 
 

1959 births
Living people
Commanders of the Royal Netherlands Navy
Royal Netherlands Navy admirals
Royal Netherlands Navy personnel
Military personnel from The Hague